William Scranton (1917–2013) was an American politician who served as Governor of Pennsylvania 1963 to 1967

William Scranton may also refer to:

William Scranton III (born 1947), American politician who served as Lieutenant Governor of Pennsylvania from 1979 to 1987 
William B. Scranton (1856–1922), American physician and Methodist missionary in Korea
William Walker Scranton (1844–1916), American businessman